USS Porcupine may refer to:

, a schooner on Lake Erie during the War of 1812
, an  during World War II, sunk by the Japanese

United States Navy ship names